Udma State assembly constituency is one of the 140 state legislative assembly constituencies in Kerala state in southern India. It is also one of the 7 state legislative assembly constituencies included in the Kasaragod Lok Sabha constituency. As of the 2021 assembly elections, the current MLA is C. H. Kunhambu of CPI(M).

Local self governed segments

Udma Niyamasabha constituency is composed of the following local self-governed segments:

Members of Legislative Assembly 
The following list contains all members of Kerala legislative assembly who have represented the constituency:

Key

    

* indicates by-polls

Election results

2021 Niyamasabha Election 
There were 2,14,209 registered voters in the constituency for the 2021 election.

Niyamasabha Election 2016 
There were 1,99,962 registered voters in the constituency for the 2016 election.

Niyamasabha Election 2011 
There were 1,73,459 registered voters in the constituency for the 2011 election.

See also
 Udma
 Kasaragod district
 List of constituencies of the Kerala Legislative Assembly
 2016 Kerala Legislative Assembly election

References 

Assembly constituencies of Kerala

State assembly constituencies in Kasaragod district